Little St. Anne's Skete or the Minor Skete of St. Anne is an Orthodox skete on Mount Athos.

Cells
Some cells in the main area of the skete include:

Anastasis Christou
Apostomis Timiou Prodromou
Kimiseos Theotokou

Notable residents
Notable monks who lived at the skete include St. Joseph the Hesychast and his brotherhood, including disciples Arsenios the Cave Dweller, Ephraim of Arizona, and Joseph of Vatopedi. The hermitage of St. Joseph the Hesychast can be reached via a narrow footpath through a forest, which branches off from the main path connecting Little St. Anne's Skete with the Skete of Saint Anne.

Elder  is currently the hegumen of the skete.

References

Sketes in Mount Athos
Greek Orthodox monasteries
Great Lavra